Polemocrates  or Polemokrates may refer to:

Polemocrates of Elimeia, father of the Macedonian general Coenus
Polemocrates (physician), son of Machaon